S P Crater is a cinder cone volcano in the San Francisco volcanic field,  north of Flagstaff, Arizona, United States. It is surrounded by several other cinder cones which are older and more eroded. American astronauts use the crater to train for moonwalking.

Name
The naming of the mountain is a bit of lore from the Old West. S P Crater can be climbed, and the lava flow can be viewed from the crater rim. C. J. Babbit, an 1880s rancher and early landowner of the mountain, expressed his opinion that the mountain resembled a spilled chamber pot (or Shit Pot, "SP"), and locally this became the accepted name. When viewed from certain angles on the ground, the combination of the smooth round shape of the cone, the dark lava spatter on the rim, and the long dark lava flow extruding from the base may resemble human waste. Mapmakers refused to spell out the full name, and the mountain has been shown on maps and other literature with the abbreviated name.

Geology
The cone is capped by an agglutinate rim that helps to protect its structure. Some scientists consider the lava flow to have slightly predated the cinder cone because of geochemical data that suggests the flow is more silica rich than the cinders and based on the observation that the cone overlaps the lava flow and shows no sign of deformation. However, there is some debate about the relationship between the cone and flow as it is not uncommon to form cinder cones during the early phase of an eruption as a magma degasses, and then to have lava push through the side of a cone during a late phase of eruption.

K–Ar dates on the lava are about 70 ka, but are considered unreliable because of excess argon and the un-weathered young appearance of the cone.

References

External links

  (photo gallery)
  ( hike to the top )
 

Mountains of Arizona
Cinder cones of the United States
Landforms of Coconino County, Arizona
Volcanoes of Arizona
Mountains of Coconino County, Arizona